The FCB group is a superphylum of bacteria named after the main member phyla Fibrobacterota, Chlorobiota, and Bacteroidota. The members are considered to form a clade due to a number of conserved signature indels.

Cavalier-Smith calls the equivalent grouping a phylum by the name of Sphingobacteria. It contains the classes Chlorobiota, Fibrobacterota, Bacteroidota, and Flavobacteria. However, this megaclassification is not followed by the larger scientific community.

An analogous situation is seen with the PVC group/Planctobacteria.

Notes

See also
 List of bacterial orders
 List of bacteria genera

References 

Superphyla